The 2016 DFB-Pokal Final decided the winner of the 2015–16 DFB-Pokal, the 73rd season of Germany's premier knockout football cup competition. It was played on 21 May 2016 at the Olympiastadion in Berlin.

Borussia Dortmund, who had lost in the two previous finals, faced Bayern Munich, the record title-holders. Bayern won 4–3 on penalties, as the match had finished 0–0 after extra time, giving Bayern their 18th title.

With the win, Bayern completed the domestic double, and therefore played away to 2015–16 Bundesliga runners-up Dortmund in the 2016 DFL-Supercup on 14 August 2016. Because Bayern had already qualified for the Champions League, the sixth-placed team in the Bundesliga, Mainz 05, earned automatic qualification for the group stage of next year's edition of the UEFA Europa League, and the league's third qualifying round spot went to the team in seventh, Hertha BSC.

Background

It was Bayern's twenty-first final, with a record of seventeen wins, the most of any club, and three losses prior. Bayern's last final won was in 2014. It was Dortmund's eighth overall and third consecutive final, with a record of three wins and four losses prior. Dortmund's last final won was in 2012. This was the ninth match between Bayern and Dortmund in the DFB-Pokal, and the fourth final between them, all within the last eight years, having previously met in 2008, 2012, and 2014, making it the most common final. Of these, Bayern have won two (in 2008, winning 2–1 after extra time, and 2014, winning 2–0 after extra time), while Dortmund have won once (in 2012, winning 5–2).

Bayern and Dortmund also met each other in the semi-finals of the previous season of the DFB-Pokal. The match finished 1–1 after extra time, and Dortmund won 2–0 on penalties. The other matches between these two sides took place in 1966, where Bayern won 2–0 in the qualification round, 1981, where Bayern won 4–0 in the third round, 1992, where Dortmund won 5–4 on penalties in the second round as the match finished 2–2 after extra time, and 2013, where Bayern won 1–0 in the quarter-finals. This makes for a total of five wins for Bayern, and one win and two penalty shoot-out wins for Dortmund.

The game was Bayern coach Pep Guardiola's final match, after three years in charge of the team. Guardiola will go on to replace Manuel Pellegrini at Manchester City. For Dortmund manager Thomas Tuchel, it was his first season in charge as coach. Guardiola praised Tuchel for an impressive season, finishing second in the Bundesliga and making it to the cup final.

On 10 May 2016, it was announced that Dortmund defender Mats Hummels would be leaving the club at the end of the season. The cup final would be his last match for Dortmund, against his future club Bayern, whom he signed a five-year contract with, starting 1 July 2016. Hummels himself was a Bayern youth product, but he only made one senior appearance before moving to Dortmund in 2008, initially on loan. The transfer to Bayern was received negatively by many Dortmund fans, as he was the third Dortmund player to move to Bayern since 2013.

Route to the final
The DFB-Pokal began with 64 teams in a single-elimination knockout cup competition. There were a total of five rounds leading up to the final. Teams were drawn against each other, and the winner after 90 minutes would advance. If still tied, 30 minutes of extra time was played. If the score was still level, a penalty shoot-out was used to determine the winner.

Note: In all results below, the score of the finalist is given first (H: home; A: away).

Match

Details

Statistics

References

External links
 
 Match report at kicker.de 
 Match report at WorldFootball.net
 Match report at Fussballdaten.de 

FC Bayern Munich matches
Borussia Dortmund matches
2015–16 in German football cups
2016
May 2016 sports events in Germany
2016 in Berlin
Football competitions in Berlin
DFB-Pokal Final 2016